Himmel auf (Sky Open) is the fourth studio album by German band Silbermond. It was released on 23 March 2012 by Columbia Records.

Track listing
All song written by Thomas Stolle, Johannes Stolle, Andreas Nowak, and Stefanie Kloß.

Charts

Weekly charts

Year-end charts

Certifications and sales

Release history

References

External links
 Silbermond.de — official site

2015 albums
Silbermond albums